Poly, from the Greek πολύς meaning "many" or "much", may refer to:

Businesses
 China Poly Group Corporation, a Chinese business group, and its subsidiaries:
 Poly Property, a Hong Kong incorporated Chinese property developer
 Poly Real Estate, a Chinese real estate developer
 Poly Technologies, a defense manufacturing company
 Poly (company), formerly Polycom, an American communications technology company

People
 Poly (footballer) (1906-1986), full name Policarpo Ribeiro de Oliveira, Brazilian footballer
 Natasha Poly (born 1985), stage name of Russian supermodel Natalya Sergeyevna Polevshchikova
 Poly Styrene (1957–2011), stage name of British musician Marianne Joan Elliott-Said

Other uses
 Hong Kong Polytechnic University, locally known as Poly
 Poly (website), a website by Google
 Polynesian, often shortened to poly, as in ‘Poly people are also called “Pasifika” or “Tangata Moana” (people of the ocean)’
 Polyamory, often shortened to poly, as in 'poly relationship'
 Polyethylene, often shortened to poly, as in 'poly gloves'
 Polyspheric or Poly, lower-cost V8 engines produced by Chrysler from 1955 to 1958
 Polytechnic Heights, Fort Worth, Texas, locally known as Poly
 Polytechnic Institute of NYU, locally known as Poly
 The Rensselaer Polytechnic, also known as The Poly, the student newspaper of Rensselaer Polytechnic Institute
 Royal Cornwall Polytechnic Society, a UK charity commonly known as "The Poly"

See also
 Poly-1, a 1980s desktop computer designed in New Zealand for educational use
 Warren CP-1, also called Miss Poly, a 1929 aircraft built by engineering students at California Polytechnic College
 
 
 Polly (disambiguation)